Guettarda retusa was a species of plant in the family Rubiaceae. It was endemic to Cuba. It became extinct due to habitat loss.

References

retusa
Endemic flora of Cuba
Trees of Cuba
Extinct flora of North America
Plant extinctions since 1500
Taxonomy articles created by Polbot